FC Sportist is the Bulgarian football club from the town of General Toshevo, which currently plays in the Third Amateur League, the third tier of Bulgarian football.

History
Sportist General Toshevo was founded in 1945, with the name "Orlov", then called "Urozhay"  "Septemvri","Locomotiv" and "Spartak". From 1970, the name was changed to "Sportist". The team played two seasons in the B PFG - 1983/1984 and 1984/1985. The main colors of the club are red or white shirts and red shorts. Sportist plays matches at Sportist stadium, with a capacity of 6000 seats.

In 2020, the team managed to promote to the Third Amateur League for the 2020-21 season.

Sportist
1945 establishments in Bulgaria